The  and  are diesel multiple unit (DMU) train types operated by West Japan Railway Company (JR-West) on the Kishin Line between  and . A total of 19 cars have been delivered, formed as seven single-car KiHa 122 series units and six two-car KiHa 127 series units. Test-running commenced in late September 2008, with the units entering revenue-earning service from the start of the revised timetable on 14 March 2009.

Exterior
The body design features improved crash resistance, based on the 223 series electric multiple unit design. The cars use environmentally-friendly diesel engines with reduced NOx and particulate emissions.

Externally, the units are finished in unpainted metal with thin yellow and red waistline stripes.

Interior
Internally, the cars feature flip-over reversible seating arranged 2+1 abreast. Toilets in both types of train are wheelchair-accessible, and the step between the passenger compartment and station platform has been eliminated.

Formations
The KiHa 122 single-car units and KiHa 127 two-car units are formed as follows.

KiHa 122 series (single-car unit)
The KiHa 122 series uses a diesel engine with a small lithium-ion battery (18 kWh) that is used to power auxiliary machines in the train.

(Equipped with toilet)

KiHa 127 series (2-car units)

(KiHa 127-0 is equipped with a toilet.)

Derivatives
 ET122, single-car DMUs for use on the third-sector Echigo Tokimeki Railway Nihonkai Hisui Line since March 2015

References

External links

 KiHa 122/127 series press release (JR-West) 
 JR-West KiHa 122/127 series (Japan Railfan Magazine) 

122 series
West Japan Railway Company
Niigata Transys rolling stock
Train-related introductions in 2009